Arout Parsekian (born April 17, 1970) is a retired Armenian-Cypriot Freestyle wrestler.

Parsekian competed at the 1996 Summer Olympics. He is only the second wrestler from Cyprus to qualify for the Olympics, after Konstantinos Iliadis.

References

External links
 

1970 births
Living people
Cypriot male sport wrestlers
Wrestlers at the 1994 Commonwealth Games
Commonwealth Games bronze medallists for Cyprus
Wrestlers at the 1996 Summer Olympics
Olympic wrestlers of Cyprus
Cypriot people of Armenian descent
Ethnic Armenian sportspeople
Commonwealth Games medallists in wrestling
Medallists at the 1994 Commonwealth Games